Jeníčkova Lhota is a village and a part of the Chotoviny municipality in the South Bohemian Region of the Czech Republic.

Old historical names

Pňová Lhota, Přímá Lhota, Pněví Lhota, Purkartova Lhota, Paldíkova Lhota

History
Jeníčkova Lhota was first mentioned in the year 1360, in connection with Přibík Lysec of Pňová Lhota and ancestor of yeoman's clan Štítný ze Štítného - Mikšík of Pňová Lhota.
In the year 1621 Jeníčkova Lhota was burnt out by troops sieged near hussite town Tábor, and lately the village was recovered by Kašpar Hencl of Štenberk.
After the Thirty Years' War the village was divided into five parts:
 Pacov part – belonged to Whitefriars from Pacov
 Měšice part – belonged to farmhouse in Měšice
 Chotoviny part – belonged to Vít's of Rzavé, lately Vratislav's of Mitrovice
 Kostelní záduší part – belonged to vicary in Chotoviny
 So called "Free part" – owned by independent Sedloň's clan

Notable families
Volf of Jeníčkova and Broučkova Lhota, Jeníček, Zavadil, Berka, Sedloň, Herout, Mík, Slunéčko and others.

Fortress
The fortress in Jeníčkova Lhota was built in the 18th century and rebuilt as a manor house with a chapel two centuries later. Today it stands almost in ruins.

Gallery

External links
Chotoviny website

Villages in Tábor District